The R377 is a Regional Route in South Africa that connects Delareyville with Vergeleë via Stella.

Route
Its north-western terminus is the R375 at Vergeleë. It heads south east, through Piet Plessis to Stella, where it meets the N18 at a staggered junction. From Stella it heads east-south-east to its south-eastern terminus at the N14 just west of Delareyville.

External links
 Routes Travel Info

References

Regional Routes in North West (South African province)